Achen Amar Muktar is a National Awards-winning Bengali language song from the 1978's Bangladeshi film Golapi Ekhon Traine, which was also won numerous National Awards including Best Film. The song written by Gazi Mazharul Anwar, composed by Alauddin Ali and sung by Syed Abdul Hadi. Veteran actor Anwar Hossain performed with the song. The song gaind popularity from the audience after release of the film.

Release
The song released as the part of soundtrack album of the Golapi Ekhon Traine, which was released on September 5, 1978.

Accolades

References

Bengali-language songs
1978 songs
Best Male Playback Singer National Film Award (Bangladesh)-winning songs
Syed Abdul Hadi songs
Songs with music by Alauddin Ali